The Costello Memoirs is a collection of writings by Australian politician and long-standing treasurer and deputy Liberal leader Peter Costello and co-authored by former New South Wales Liberal Leader and Costello's father-in-law, Peter Coleman. The book was launched on 16 September 2008 at the National Press Club and released in stores on 17 September 2008.

Booksellers were obliged by Melbourne University Publishing to sign a confidentiality agreement, common with new release books, stating they would not release the book before the official release date, with harsh legal ramifications if they did.

Extracts from the book appeared in newspapers across Australia before the book's release.

References

External links
The Costello Memoirs, Melbourne University Publishing

Books about politics of Australia
2008 non-fiction books
Melbourne University Publishing books